Give the People What They Want is the nineteenth studio album by the English rock group the Kinks. It was released in August 1981 in the US but not until January 1982 in Europe. It was delayed because lead singer  Ray Davies wanted to produce a full-length video for the album but financing fell through. Also scrapped were plans to remix the album for the European market. It was initially aimed to be a statement on the media.

Reissue 
When the Kinks' six Arista studio albums, initially released between 1977 and 1984, were reissued in 1999, Give the People What They Want was the only one that did not contain bonus tracks, although the single release of "Better Things" was slightly different from the album version. The British single of "Better Things" also included a non-album B-side, "Massive Reductions", which was different from the version of the song from the band's 1984 album Word of Mouth.

Track listing

Personnel 
The Kinks
 Ray Davies – guitar, keyboards, vocals
 Dave Davies – guitar, vocals
 Jim Rodford – bass
 Mick Avory – drums
 Ian Gibbons – keyboards

Additional personnel
 Chrissie Hynde – vocals on "Predictable", "Add It Up", "Art Lover" and "A Little Bit of Abuse" (uncredited)

Technical
 Ben Fenner – engineer
 Robert Ellis – photography

Notes

External links

1981 albums
The Kinks albums
Arista Records albums
Albums produced by Ray Davies